Frantz Vitko was the president of the Federation of Trade Unions of Belarus (FPB) 2001–02. Vitko, who had voiced criticism against the government, was persuaded to resign, and was replaced by Leonid Kozik.

References

Belarusian trade unionists
Year of birth missing (living people)
Living people